The 2012–13 Portland Trail Blazers season was the 43rd season of the franchise in the National Basketball Association (NBA). The offseason saw the team draft a pair of first round draft picks, future All-Star Damian Lillard was taken 6th overall and Meyers Leonard was taken 11th overall. Despite the team finishing off 11th place in the Western Conference with a mediocre 33–49 record including a 13-game losing streak to finish, Lillard enjoyed a stellar rookie season, winning Rookie of the Year honors for his efforts.

The Blazers would not miss the playoffs again until 2022.

Key dates
 June 28: The 2012 NBA draft took place at Prudential Center in Newark, New Jersey.
 July 1: Free agency started and players were allowed to negotiate contracts with new or their old teams.
 July 11: Ten-day moratorium ended; players were allowed to sign contracts with new or their old teams and teams were allowed to resume making trades.

Draft

Roster

Pre-season

|- style="background:#cfc;"
| 1
| October 10
| @ L. A. Lakers
| 
| LaMarcus Aldridge, Damian Lillard (14)
| LaMarcus Aldridge (8)
| Damian Lillard (7)
| Citizens Business Bank Arena10,500
| 1–0
|- style="background:#fcc;"
| 2
| October 12
| @ Phoenix
| 
| Damian Lillard (15)
| LaMarcus Aldridge (10)
| Damian Lillard (5)
| US Airways Center10,698
| 1–1
|- style="background:#fcc;"
| 3
| October 15
| @ Sacramento
| 
| Damian Lillard (20)
| LaMarcus Aldridge, J. J. Hickson (7)
| Nicolas Batum (5)
| Power Balance Pavilion9,328
| 1–2
|- style="background:#cfc;"
| 4
| October 17
| Denver
| 
| Wesley Matthews (19)
| Joel Freeland (8)
| Nolan Smith (8)
| Rose Garden17,856
| 2–2
|- style="background:#fcc;"
| 5
| October 19
| Golden State
| 
| LaMarcus Aldridge (18)
| Meyers Leonard (6)
| Damian Lillard (7)
| Rose Garden19,109
| 2–3
|- style="background:#cfc;"
| 6
| October 22
| Utah
| 
| Nicolas Batum (27)
| J. J. Hickson (8)
| Damian Lillard (8)
| Rose Garden19,150
| 3–3
|- style="background:#fcc;"
| 7
| October 25
| @ Utah
| 
| Wesley Matthews (24)
| LaMarcus Aldridge (11)
| Damian Lillard (5)
| EnergySolutions Arena18,247
| 3–4

Regular season

Standings

Game log

|- style="background:#cfc;"
| 1 || October 31 || L. A. Lakers
| 
| Nicolas Batum (26)
| J. J. Hickson (10)
| Damian Lillard (11)
| Rose Garden20,401
| 1–0

|- style="background:#fcc;"      
| 2 || November 2 || @ Oklahoma City
| 
| LaMarcus Aldridge (22)
| LaMarcus Aldridge (15)
| Damian Lillard (7)
| Chesapeake Energy Arena18,203
| 1–1
|- style="background:#cfc;"      
| 3 || November 3 || @ Houston
| 
| LaMarcus Aldridge (27)
| J. J. Hickson (12)
| Damian Lillard (9)
| Toyota Center18,140
| 2–1
|- style="background:#fcc;"      
| 4 || November 5 || @ Dallas
| 
| Aldridge & Matthews (20)
| J. J. Hickson (11)
| Damian Lillard (5)
| American Airlines Center19,521
| 2–2
|- style="background:#fcc;"      
| 5 || November 8 || L. A. Clippers
| 
| Nicolas Batum (23)
| Nicolas Batum (9)
| Batum & Aldridge (5)
| Rose Garden20,425
| 2–3
|- style="background:#fcc;"      
| 6 || November 10 || San Antonio
| 
| Nicolas Batum (35)
| J. J. Hickson (14)
| LaMarcus Aldridge (7)
| Rose Garden20,447
| 2–4
|- style="background:#fcc;"      
| 7 || November 12 || Atlanta
| 
| Batum & Hickson (19)
| J. J. Hickson (18)
| LaMarcus Aldridge (8)
| Rose Garden19,095
| 2–5
|- style="background:#cfc;"    
| 8 || November 13 || @ Sacramento
| 
| Damian Lillard (22)
| J. J. Hickson (13)
| Damian Lillard (9)
| Sleep Train Arena10,153
| 3–5
|- style="background:#cfc;"     
| 9 || November 16 || Houston
| 
| Nicolas Batum (35)
| Meyers Leonard (8)
| Lillard & Matthews (5)
| Rose Garden20,382
| 4-5
|- style="background:#cfc;"      
| 10 || November 18 || Chicago
| 
| Batum & Matthews (21)
| LaMarcus Aldridge (13)
| Ronnie Price (5)
| Rose Garden20,242
| 5–5
|- style="background:#fcc;"    
| 11 || November 21 || @ Phoenix
| 
| Damian Lillard (24)
| LaMarcus Aldridge (7)
| Nicolas Batum (4)
| US Airways Center14,263
| 5–6
|- style="background:#cfc;"     
| 12 || November 23 || Minnesota
| 
| Wesley Matthews (30)
| J. J. Hickson (13)
| Damian Lillard (8)
| Rose Garden20,555
| 6-6
|- style="background:#fcc;"      
| 13 || November 25 || @ Brooklyn
| 
| Wesley Matthews (20)
| J. J. Hickson (10)
| Damian Lillard (7)
| Barclays Center16,542
| 6-7
|- style="background:#fcc;"      
| 14 || November 26 || @ Detroit
| 
| LaMarcus Aldridge (32)
| Batum & Aldridge (10)
| Damian Lillard (7)
| The Palace of Auburn Hills10,212
| 6-8
|- style="background:#fcc;"      
| 15 || November 28 || @ Washington
| 
| Batum & Lillard (20)
| J. J. Hickson (19)
| Damian Lillard (5)
| Verizon Center14,114
| 6-9
|- style="background:#fcc;"     
| 16 || November 30 || @ Boston
| 
| LaMarcus Aldridge (23)
| LaMarcus Aldridge (8)
| Will Barton (4)
| TD Garden18,624
| 6-10

|- style="background:#cfc;"      
| 17 || December 1 || @ Cleveland
| 
| Damian Lillard (24)
| LaMarcus Aldridge (9)
| Damian Lillard (11)
| Quicken Loans Arena16,624
| 7-10
|- style="background:#cfc;"    
| 18 || December 3 || @ Charlotte
| 
| LaMarcus Aldridge (25)
| Batum & Aldridge (13)
| Damian Lillard (9)
| Time Warner Cable Arena12,640
| 8-10
|- style="background:#fcc;"      
| 19 || December 5 || @ Indiana
| 
| Damian Lillard (23)
| J. J. Hickson (12)
| Damian Lillard (6)
| Bankers Life Fieldhouse11,569
| 8-11
|- style="background:#fcc;"      
| 20 || December 8 || Sacramento
| 
| LaMarcus Aldridge (17)
| J. J. Hickson (15)
| Damian Lillard (9)
| Rose Garden19,454
| 8-12
|- style="background:#cfc;"      
| 21 || December 10 || Toronto
| 
| LaMarcus Aldridge (30)
| LaMarcus Aldridge (12)
| Damian Lillard (6)
| Rose Garden16,863
| 9-12
|- style="background:#cfc;"      
| 22 || December 13 || San Antonio
| 
| Damian Lillard (29)
| J. J. Hickson (12)
| Nicolas Batum (8)
| Rose Garden19,118
| 10-12
|- style="background:#cfc;"     
| 23 || December 16 || New Orleans
| 
| J. J. Hickson (24)
| J. J. Hickson (16)
| Nicolas Batum (10)
| Rose Garden18,772
| 11-12
|- style="background:#cfc;"     
| 24 || December 20 || Denver
| 
| Nicolas Batum (22)
| J. J. Hickson (18)
| Damian Lillard (10)
| Rose Garden19,982
| 12-12
|- style="background:#cfc;"     
| 25 || December 22 || Phoenix
| 
| Damian Lillard (25)
| J. J. Hickson (15)
| Nicolas Batum (8)
| Rose Garden19,746
| 13-12
|- style="background:#fcc;"     
| 26 || December 23 || @ Sacramento
| 
| LaMarcus Aldridge (22)
| Hickson & Aldridge (11)
| Nicolas Batum (8)
| Sleep Train Arena13,244
| 13-13
|- style="background:#cfc;"     
| 27 || December 26 || Sacramento
| 
| LaMarcus Aldridge (28)
| J. J. Hickson (14)
| Damian Lillard (11)
| Rose Garden20,545
| 14-13
|- style="background:#fcc;"    
| 28 || December 28 || @ L. A. Lakers
| 
| LaMarcus Aldridge (26)
| J. J. Hickson (8)
| Nicolas Batum (8)
| Staples Center18,997
| 14-14
|- style="background:#cfc;"      
| 29 || December 29 || Philadelphia
| 
| Nicolas Batum (22)
| J. J. Hickson (13)
| Nicolas Batum (8)
| Rose Garden20,569
| 15-14

|- style="background:#cfc;"      
| 30 || January 1 || @ New York
| 
| Nicolas Batum (26)
| LaMarcus Aldridge (14)
| Batum & Lillard (6)
| Madison Square Garden19,033
| 16-14
|- style="background:#fcc;"      
| 31 || January 2 || @ Toronto
| 
| Damian Lillard (18)
| LaMarcus Aldridge (10)
| Damian Lillard (7)
| Air Canada Centre18,117
| 16-15
|- style="background:#cfc;"     
| 32 || January 4 || @ Memphis
| 
| Wesley Matthews (21)
| LaMarcus Aldridge (12)
| Damian Lillard (8)
| FedExForum15,823
| 17-15
|- style="background:#cfc;"     
| 33 || January 5 || @ Minnesota
| 
| Batum & Matthews (26)
| J. J. Hickson (11)
| Aldridge & Lillard (6)
| Target Center16,220
| 18-15
|- style="background:#cfc;"      
| 34 || January 7 || Orlando
| 
| LaMarcus Aldridge (27)
| J. J. Hickson (15)
| Batum & Lillard (10)
| Rose Garden19,560
| 19-15
|- style="background:#cfc;"      
| 35 || January 10 || Miami
| 
| Nicolas Batum (28)
| LaMarcus Aldridge (15)
| Damian Lillard (8)
| Rose Garden20,536
| 20-15
|- style="background:#fcc;"      
| 36 || January 11 || @ Golden State
| 
| Damian Lillard (37)
| J. J. Hickson (12)
| LaMarcus Aldridge (5)
| Oracle Arena19,596
| 20-16
|- style="background:#fcc;"      
| 37 || January 13 || Oklahoma City
| 
| LaMarcus Aldridge (33)
| LaMarcus Aldridge (11)
| Damian Lillard (9)
| Rose Garden20,423
| 20-17
|- style="background:#fcc;"      
| 38 || January 15 || @ Denver
| 
| LaMarcus Aldridge (28)
| J. J. Hickson (13)
| Nicolas Batum (7)
| Pepsi Center15,521
| 20-18
|- style="background:#fcc;"
| 39 || January 16 || Cleveland
| 
| Nicolas Batum (23)
| Nicolas Batum (12)
| Damian Lillard (7)
| Rose Garden18,880
| 20-19
|- style="background:#fcc;"
| 40 || January 19 || Milwaukee
| 
| Damian Lillard (26)
| LaMarcus Aldridge (14)
| Damian Lillard (10)
| Rose Garden20,487
| 20-20
|- style="background:#fcc;"
| 41 || January 21 || Washington
| 
| Damian Lillard (18)
| LaMarcus Aldridge (12)
| Nicolas Batum (11)
| Rose Garden17,366
| 20-21
|- style="background:#cfc;"
| 42 || January 23 || Indiana
| 
| LaMarcus Aldridge (27)
| J. J. Hickson (13)
| Batum & Lillard (8)
| Rose Garden18,934
| 21-21
|- style="background:#cfc;"
| 43 || January 26 || L. A. Clippers
| 
| Batum & Lillard (20)
| Nicolas Batum (10)
| Nicolas Batum (12)
| Rose Garden20,672
| 22-21
|- style="background:#fcc;"
| 44 || January 27 || @ L. A. Clippers
| 
| LaMarcus Aldridge (21)
| LaMarcus Aldridge (11)
| Batum & Matthews (8)
| Staples Center19,060
| 22-22
|- style="background:#cfc;"
| 45 || January 29 || Dallas
| 
| LaMarcus Aldridge (29)
| J. J. Hickson (15)
| Damian Lillard (8)
| Rose Garden18,888
| 23-22

|- style="background:#fcc;"
| 46 || February 1 || @ Utah
| 
| Damian Lillard (26)
| LaMarcus Aldridge (10)
| Damian Lillard (5)
| EnergySolutions Arena19,512
| 23-23
|- style="background:#cfc;"      
| 47 || February 2 || Utah
| 
| Damian Lillard (23)
| Aldridge & Hickson (11)
| Nicolas Batum (9)
| Rose Garden20,376
| 24-23
|- style="background:#cfc;"      
| 48 || February 4 || @ Minnesota
| 
| LaMarcus Aldridge (25)
| LaMarcus Aldridge (13)
| Damian Lillard (6)
| Target Center13,446
| 25-23
|- style="background:#fcc;"      
| 49 || February 6 || @ Dallas
| 
| LaMarcus Aldridge (27)
| Aldridge & Hickson (10)
| Batum & Lillard (6)
| American Airlines Center19,746
| 25-24
|- style="background:#fcc;"
| 50 || February 8 || @ Houston
| 
| LaMarcus Aldridge (31)
| LaMarcus Aldridge (11)
| Damian Lillard (6)
| Toyota Center15,655
| 25-25
|- style="background:#fcc;"
| 51 || February 10 || @ Orlando
| 
| LaMarcus Aldridge (25)
| Nicolas Batum (8)
| Damian Lillard (12)
| Amway Center17,966
| 25-26
|- style="background:#fcc;"
| 52 || February 12 || @ Miami
| 
| Damian Lillard (33)
| Wesley Matthews (6)
| Nicolas Batum (4)
| American Airlines Arena20,032
| 25-27
|- style="background:#fcc;"
| 53 || February 13 || @ New Orleans
| 
| Damian Lillard (12)
| Víctor Claver (6)
| Nicolas Batum (6)
| New Orleans Arena11,656
| 25-28
|- align="center"
|colspan="9" bgcolor="#bbcaff"|All-Star Break
|- style="background:#fcc;"
| 54 || February 19 || Phoenix
| 
| J. J. Hickson (25)
| J. J. Hickson (16)
| Damian Lillard (7)
| Rose Garden20,499
| 25-29
|- style="background:#fcc;"      
| 55 || February 22 || @ L. A. Lakers
| 
| Nicolas Batum & J. J. Hickson (22)
| J. J. Hickson (11)
| Wesley Matthews (8)
| Staples Center18,997
| 25-30
|- style="background:#cfc;"
| 56 || February 24 || Boston
| 
| Wesley Matthews (24)
| J. J. Hickson (11)
| Damian Lillard (6)
| Rose Garden20,484
| 26-30
|- style="background:#fcc;"      
| 57 || February 27 || Denver
| 
| Damian Lillard (26)
| J. J. Hickson (14)
| Nicolas Batum (9)
| Rose Garden20,077
| 26-31

|- style="background:#cfc;"      
| 58 || March 2 || Minnesota
| 
| Damian Lillard (24)
| J. J. Hickson (16)
| Eric Maynor (12)
| Rose Garden20,390
| 27-31
|- style="background:#cfc;"     
| 59 || March 4 || Charlotte
| 
| LaMarcus Aldridge (23)
| LaMarcus Aldridge (14)
| Damian Lillard (7)
| Rose Garden18,330
| 28-31
|- style="background:#fcc;"     
| 60 || March 6 || @ Memphis
|  
| Damian Lillard (20)
| J. J. Hickson (13)
| LaMarcus Aldridge (6)
| FedExForum16,214
| 28-32
|- style="background:#cfc;"     
| 61 || March 8 || @ San Antonio
|   
| Damian Lillard (35)
| J. J. Hickson (11)
| Damian Lillard (9)
| AT&T Center18,581
| 29-32
|- style="background:#fcc;"     
| 62 || March 10 || @ New Orleans
| 
| Wesley Matthews (24)
| J. J. Hickson (14)
| Damian Lillard (8)
| New Orleans Arena15,036
| 29-33
|- style="background:#fcc;"      
| 63 || March 12 || Memphis
| 
| LaMarcus Aldridge (28)
| Nicolas Batum (10)
| Damian Lillard (7)
| Rose Garden18,754
| 29-34
|- style="background:#cfc;"      
| 64 || March 14 || New York
| 
| Damian Lillard (26)
| J. J. Hickson (16)
| Damian Lillard (10)
| Rose Garden20,636
| 30-34
|- style="background:#cfc;"      
| 65 || March 16 || Detroit
| 
| LaMarcus Aldridge (31)
| J. J. Hickson (15)
| Damian Lillard (7)
| Rose Garden20,161
| 31-34
|- style="background:#fcc;"     
| 66 || March 18 || @ Philadelphia
| 
| LaMarcus Aldridge (32)
| LaMarcus Aldridge (14)
| Damian Lillard (7)
| Wells Fargo Center15,623
| 31-35
|- style="background:#fcc;"     
| 67 || March 19 || @ Milwaukee
| 
| Wesley Matthews (24)
| LaMarcus Aldridge (15)
| Damian Lillard (11)
| BMO Harris Bradley Center14,397
| 31-36
|- style="background:#cfc;"     
| 68 || March 21 || @ Chicago
| 
| LaMarcus Aldridge (28)
| J. J. Hickson (21)
| Damian Lillard (7)
| United Center21,946
| 32-36
|- style="background:#cfc;"     
| 69 || March 22 || @ Atlanta
| 
| Wesley Matthews (28)
| LaMarcus Aldridge (13)
| Nicolas Batum (7)
| Philips Arena16,348
| 33-36
|- style="background:#fcc;"     
| 70 || March 24 || @ Oklahoma City
| 
| Damian Lillard (19)
| LaMarcus Aldridge (12)
| Nicolas Batum (8)
| Chesapeake Energy Arena18,203
| 33-37
|- style="background:#fcc;"     
| 71 || March 27 || Brooklyn
| 
| LaMarcus Aldridge (24)
| Meyers Leonard (9)
| Nicolas Batum (6)
| Rose Garden20,127
| 33-38
|- style="background:#fcc;"     
| 72 || March 29 || Utah
| 
| Damian Lillard (24)
| J. J. Hickson (14)
| Damian Lillard (7)
| Rose Garden19,527
| 33-39
|- style="background:#fcc;"     
| 73 || March 30 || @ Golden State
| 
| Meyers Leonard (22)
| J. J. Hickson (10)
| Nicolas Batum (9)
| Oracle Arena19,596
| 33-40

|- style="background:#fcc;"       
| 74 || April 1 || @ Utah
| 
| Wesley Matthews (23)
| J. J. Hickson (7)
| Eric Maynor (8)
| EnergySolutions Arena18,336
| 33–41
|- style="background:#fcc;"     
| 75 || April 3 || Memphis
| 
| J. J. Hickson (17)
| J. J. Hickson (9)
| Eric Maynor (10)
| Rose Garden19,275
| 33–42
|- style="background:#fcc;"      
| 76 || April 5 || Houston
| 
| LaMarcus Aldridge (32)
| LaMarcus Aldridge (13)
| Damian Lillard (7)
| Rose Garden20,400
| 33–43
|- style="background:#fcc;"      
| 77 || April 7 || Dallas
| 
| Will Barton (22)
| Will Barton (13)
| Maynor & Barton (6)
| Rose Garden20,228
| 33–44
|- style="background:#fcc;"     
| 78 || April 10 || L. A. Lakers
| 
| Damian Lillard (38)
| LaMarcus Aldridge (16)
| Damian Lillard (9)
| Rose Garden20,598
| 33–45
|- style="background:#fcc;"      
| 79 || April 12 || Oklahoma City
| 
| Will Barton (18)
| J. J. Hickson (7)
| Damian Lillard (8)
| Rose Garden20,577
| 33–46
|- style="background:#fcc;"      
| 80 || April 14 || @ Denver
| 
| Damian Lillard (30)
| Hickson & Barton (9)
| Hickson & Lillard (6)
| Pepsi Center19,155
| 33–47
|- style="background:#fcc;"      
| 81 || April 16 || @ L. A. Clippers
| 
| Will Barton (17)
| Hickson, Barton & Freeland (6)
| Damian Lillard (8)
| Staples Center19,183
| 33–48
|- style="background:#fcc;"    
| 82 || April 17 || Golden State
| 
| LaMarcus Aldridge (30)
| LaMarcus Aldridge (21)
| Eric Maynor (6)
| Rose Garden20,261
| 33–49

Awards and records
On December 5, 2012, Damian Lillard was named Western Conference Rookie of the Month for November, making him the third rookie in Blazers history to earn the honor, following Arvydas Sabonis (1994) and Brandon Roy (2007). When asked about the honor, Lillard stated "I’m happy that I can get it, but I think all that it says is that I played good for one month. My mind has been focused on being consistent for the whole season, so ... it's a big deal to win the award, but it's not a big deal for the season. I’ll be happy about it and then it’ll be gone. It's a new month already."

Injuries
Reserve guard Elliot Williams tore his left Achilles tendon during a team workout on September 9. He was out for the season.

Transactions

Overview

  Waived during the pre-season.

Trades

Free agents

References

Portland Trail Blazers seasons
Portland Trail Blazers
Portland Trail Blazers
Portland Trail Blazers
Port
Port